Jane Nassau Senior (1828–1877) was Britain's first female civil servant, and a philanthropist. She was co-founder of the Metropolitan Association for Befriending Young Servants (MABYS).

Life

Senior was born Jane Elizabeth Hughes at Uffington on 10 December 1828, daughter of John Hughes and the only sister of the author Thomas Hughes and five other brothers.

Senior did relief work for material aid for the victims of the Franco-Prussian War of 1870 as part of the inceptive National Society for Aid to Sick and Wounded in War, in 1905 reconstituted as the British Red Cross. She directed many practicalities for handling these donations.

Work with impoverished children in Surrey led to Senior's appointment in 1873, as an assistant inspector of workhouses. This post was given to her by James Stansfeld, against civil service opposition. The goal of the post was a Civil Service Report, which she framed as covering both pauper girls as school children, and their histories after school. When the Report appeared in 1875, the 1874 general election having intervened, it bore heavy criticism by Royal Navy senior officer Carleton Tufnell, acting in concert with The Times.

A meeting called by the Reverend Thomas Vincent Fosbery (then chaplain to Bishop Samuel Wilberforce) in May 1874, at Lambeth Palace. It brought together Senior, Elizabeth, wife of the Very Reverend Harold Browne Bishop of Winchester, Catharine Tait, and Mary Elizabeth Townsend (1841–1918). They agreed to set up the Girls' Friendly Society, founded on 1 January 1875 so young, "wholly unblemished" servants could have a friend of a higher social class with whom to meet, read, sew, take refreshment.

Senior, with Caroline Emelia Stephen and her cousin founded instead, the rivalling Metropolitan Association for Befriending Young Servants in 1876, to habilitate institutionalised and vulnerable girls in London. Senior had not found enough common ground with GFS's senior Anglicans who used the geographical units of the church and some of whom insisted on no hint a servant's impropriety. Instead her successful organisation sought to de-institutionalise recruits, from such places as workhouses into becoming reliable, skilled servants. Senior, with the support of Thomas John Barnardo, had lobbied for MABYS, and similar bodies, to be automatically made guardians until the age of 20 for any child who had been in Poor Law care for over five years.

She died of 'cancer of the womb' and exhaustion on 24 March 1877, aged 48; and is buried in Brookwood Cemetery in Surrey.

Associations
G. F. Watts the artist had become a confidant of Jane Senior by the mid-1850s; they corresponded, and most of the letters have been destroyed. Octavia Hill, governess for a time to the children of Thomas Hughes, became a close friend. Senior was a friend and correspondent of the novelist George Eliot.

In Clapham, Senior knew Marianne Thornton, figure of the Clapham Sect and daughter of Henry Thornton, and her niece Henrietta Synnot, both of whom were involved in local schooling. Synnot became her assistant. Caroline Stephen made a very positive impression, and was an influence for the future. In the aftermath of the "Eyre controversy", she made a point of inviting Emelia Russell Gurney, wife of Russell Gurney, to show her Jamaica sketches.

In the early 1870s Senior worked with Henrietta Rowland, teaching literacy in Whitechapel. Another associate of this period was Menella Bute Smedley, following up on girls who had left workhouse schools. For MABYS, Senior called on Bessie Belloc, Barbara Bodichon and Mrs. Knox for support.

Family
Jane married Nassau John Senior, son of Nassau William Senior, on 10 August 1848 at Shaw Church. Her husband was a barrister, but failed to make more than a desultory career in the law. From 1860 they lived in Elm House, a villa with a small wooded estate on Lavender Hill, near Clapham Junction in Battersea, south London, taking lodgers.

The marriage was unhappy. They had a son Walter Nassau (1850–1933). He married Mabel Barbara Hammersley, daughter of Hugh Hammersley and his mother's friend Dulcibella Eden, in 1888.

Dorothea Murray Hughes (1891–1952), daughter of Senior's brother Hastings Hughes, was a nurse and aid worker. She wrote Jane Elizabeth Senior: A Memoir (1915).

References

Sources

External links
Restoration of the memorial to Jane Elizabeth ("Jeanie") Senior
Recollections of the Hughes Family Walter Money, FSA

1828 births
1877 deaths
British civil servants
Deaths from uterine cancer
Burials at Brookwood Cemetery